The Quad Cities is a planned Amtrak Illinois Service intercity passenger train that will operate between Chicago and Moline in the US state of Illinois. The train will duplicate the route and stations of the Carl Sandburg and Illinois Zephyr between Chicago and Wyanet using track owned by BNSF. On the Wyanet–Moline segment, which will include a station at Geneseo, the train will use track owned by Iowa Interstate Railroad.

Background
Originally, the Rock Island provided passenger service in the Quad Cities via the Quad Cities Rocket train. The railroad initially declined to hand passenger operations over to Amtrak, and service to Chicago continued until December 31, 1978.

In 2008, United States Senators Tom Harkin and Chuck Grassley of Iowa and Dick Durbin and Barack Obama of Illinois sent a letter to Amtrak asking them to begin plans to bring rail service to the Quad Cities. In October 2010, a $230 million federal fund was announced that will bring Amtrak service to the Quad Cities, with a new line running from Moline to Chicago. They had hoped to have the line completed in 2015, and to offer two daily round trips to Chicago. In December 2011, the federal government awarded $177 million in funding for the Amtrak connection.

In 2015, Illinois Republican governor Bruce Rauner announced a spending freeze that placed both the proposed train service and the Black Hawk under review by the IDOT. After being on hold for over a year, IDOT moved forward with the project in order to prevent losing the $177 million in federal funding for the passenger service.

In July 2019, a new transportation bill was passed by the Illinois state legislature, supported by Governor J.B. Pritzker, with $225 million was appropriated to begin this service. In its 2020–2025 service plan, Amtrak forecast that the Chicago–Moline route will begin in fiscal year 2024 and attract 165,600 riders that year.

Route and stops

References

Proposed Amtrak routes
Proposed railway lines in Illinois